Vasum gurabicum is an extinct species of medium to large sea snail, a marine gastropod mollusk in the family Turbinellidae.

Description
The height of the shell: 37 mm, its diameter 24 mm.

Distribution
Fossils of this marine species have been found in Miocene and Pliocene strata of the Dominican Republic. (age range: 5.332 to 3.6 Ma)

References

 E. H. Vokes. 1998. Neogene Paleontology in the Northern Dominican Republic 18. The Superfamily Volutacea (in part) (Mollusca: Gastropoda). Bulletins of American Paleontology 113(354):1-54

External links
 

gurabicum
Gastropods described in 1917